Cythara milia is a species of sea snail, a marine gastropod mollusk in the family Mangeliidae.

This species is considered a nomen dubium.

Description

Distribution
This marine species occurs off China.

References

 Philippi, R. A. "Centuria quarta testaceorum novorum." Zeitschrift für Malakozoologie 8.3 (1851): 39–48.

External links
  Tucker, J.K. 2004 Catalog of recent and fossil turrids (Mollusca: Gastropoda). Zootaxa 682:1-1295.

milia
Gastropods described in 1851